A Bequest to the Nation is a 1970 play by Terence Rattigan, based on his 1966 television play Nelson (full title – Nelson – A Portrait in Miniature). It recounts the events surrounding Horatio Nelson, his mistress Emma Hamilton, and his wife Frances Nisbet in the events immediately before, during and after the Battle of Trafalgar.  It also includes various other historical characters such as Thomas Hardy and William Nelson.  The title refers to Nelson leaving Emma and their child Horatia to the nation on his death.

Productions

Stage
The play was first performed at the Theatre Royal, Haymarket on 23 September 1970. The director was Peter Glenville and Nelson was played by Ian Holm. Reviews were not favourable.

Television and film

In 1973, a film version was produced, with Glenda Jackson as Lady Hamilton, Peter Finch as Nelson and Margaret Leighton as Frances.  Anthony Quayle played Lord Minto.

Radio
For the Trafalgar 200 commemorations in 2005, BBC Radio 3 broadcast a radio version on 16 October that year, with Janet McTeer as Emma, Kenneth Branagh as Nelson and Amanda Root as Frances.  John Shrapnel played Lord Minto.

References

External links
A Bequest to the Nation (1973 film) on IMDb
Radio 4 production (2005)

1970 plays
Cultural depictions of Horatio Nelson
Plays based on actual events
British plays adapted into films
Plays adapted into television shows
Plays adapted into radio programs
Plays set in England
Plays set in the 19th century
Plays by Terence Rattigan
Hamish Hamilton books
West End plays